Łęczyca (in full the Royal Town of Łęczyca, ;) is a town of  inhabitants in central Poland. Situated in the Łódź Voivodeship, it is the county seat of the Łęczyca County.

Origin of the name 
The town was probably named after a West Slavic (Lechitic) tribe called Leczanie, which inhabited central Poland in the early Middle Ages. Some scholars however claim that the town was named after an Old Polish word łęg, which means a swampy plain.

In medieval Latin documents, Łęczyca is called Lonsin, Lucic, Lunciz, Lantsiza, Loncizia, Lonsitia and Lunchicia. In the early 12th century, Gallus Anonymus called Łęczyca "Lucic", and in 1154, Arab geographer Muhammad al-Idrisi named it Nugrada, placing it among other main towns of the Kingdom of Poland, such as Kraków, Sieradz, Gniezno, Wrocław and Santok.

Location 
In the past, the town was the capital of the Land of Łęczyca, which was later turned into Łęczyca Voivodeship. In the Second Polish Republic and in 1945 - 1975, Łęczyca belonged to Lodz Voivodeship. In 1975-1998, it was part of Plock Voivodeship. The geometric centre of Poland is located near Łęczyca.

History 

Łęczyca is one of the oldest Polish cities, mentioned in the 12th century. It was the place of the first recorded meeting of Sejm, the Polish parliament, in 1180. In 1229, during the period of fragmentation of Poland, it became the capital of the Duchy of Łęczyca, which in 1263 was split into two parts - the Duchy of Łęczyca and the Duchy of Sieradz. In the early 14th century, the Łęczyca Voivodeship was created with Łęczyca serving as its capital. This administrative unit of the Kingdom of Poland was part of the larger Greater Poland Province of the Polish Crown and existed until the Partitions of Poland in the late 18th century. It was a royal city of the Polish Crown.

Łęczyca, which lies in the centre of Poland, was for centuries one of the most important cities of the country. It received Magdeburg rights before 1267, and in 1331 the Teutonic Knights sacked the city during one of their repeated incursions into Poland. A considerable number of buildings were burned down, including two churches.  A few decades later, on the initiative of Casimir the Great, the city was walled and a Royal Castle built to the southeast of the city.

Łęczyca prospered in the period between the mid-14th and mid-17th centuries. The royal castle, built by Casimir the Great, was located on a small hill, protected by a moat with water from the Bzura river. The complex was made from red brick, set on stone foundations. It was protected by a 10-meter high wall, with a tower located in its southwestern corner. Gate tower was placed in the western wall, in the basement was a prison, and in the courtyard there was a two-storey tenement building. Rooms of that building frequently housed meetings of the Royal Council. In 1964, widespread renovation of the complex began. Another building was added at that time, which now houses the Museum of the Land of Łęczyca.

Soon after its completion in the mid-14th century, the castle was named one of royal residences, and the seat of the Starosta of Łęczyca. In 1406, it was burned by the Teutonic Knights, but the complex was rebuilt so quickly that in 1409, King Władysław II Jagiełło attended here a meeting of his advisors, discussing the oncoming war with the Knights.

Following the Battle of Grunwald (1410), a number of high-ranking Teutonic prisoners was kept here for ransom. Four sessions of the Sejm (Polish parliament) took place here: in 1420, 1448, 1454 and 1462. In 1420, a Bohemian delegation offered here the Czech crown to Jagiełło. In 1433, the Truce of Łęczyca was signed in the city. Furthermore, the castle served as headquarters of King Casimir IV Jagiellon, during the Thirteen Years' War (1454–66). The city's prominence came to an end with the Swedish invasion of Poland when the castle was overrun and most of the city once again destroyed, and it remained in a state of crisis until the Partitions. One of two main routes connecting Warsaw and Dresden ran through the town in the 18th century and Kings Augustus II the Strong and Augustus III of Poland often traveled that route.

World War II
During the German invasion of Poland, which started World War II, the Germans executed 29 Poles, including two families on September 9–10, 1939. Łęczyca was then occupied by Nazi Germany and incorporated into the region known as Reichsgau Wartheland as part of the district (kreis) of Lentschütz (Germanized word for 'Łęczyca'). The Germans expelled 330 Poles from the town in December 1939. Further expulsions of Poles were carried out in 1940. Poles were deported to a transit camp in nearby Ozorków, and afterwards young people were deported from the camp to forced labour in Germany, and children and older people were deported to the General Government (German-occupied central Poland), while their homes, shops and workshops were handed over to German colonists as part of the Lebensraum policy. In January 1942 there was a forced labor camp operating in or near the town.

Jews had been an important part of the population of Łęczyca since the late 1400s. At the beginning of the war in 1939, the Jewish population was more than 4000, about 30 percent of the community. The Germans began to terrorize, pillage, and humiliate the Jewish population from the beginning of the occupation. The Germans established a ghetto in late 1939, and later forbade any Jew to leave it on penalty of death. After the ghetto was enclosed, hunger and typhus ravaged the ghetto population. Periodically, hundreds of the community were expelled to other places, while Jews in other locations were brought to Łęczyca. In April 1942, the remaining Jews, about 1700 people, were sent to the Chełmno extermination camp where they were immediately gassed. The local Poles took over their houses and what meager possessions they left behind.

After the war it was reintegrated into the People's Republic of Poland.

Landmarks 

 Royal Castle - originally dating from the 14th century, rebuilt from scratch after 1964.
 Church of St Andrew the Apostle—the current church dates was consecrated in 1425.
 Dominican monastery in Ul. Pocztowa (served as a prison from 1799 until 2006). Former political internees include Władysław Gomułka and Władysław Frasyniuk.
 Cistercian church and monastery in ul. Poznańska, built between 1636-1643.
 Defensive walls of Łęczyca, some of which are still extant. The original walls enclosed an area of approximately 9 hectares, amounted to 1150 metres in length and 7 metres in height. The town plan is still recognisably that of a medieval town.

A couple of kilometres away are the Collegiate church and the earthworks at the site of the medieval settlement of Tum.

Sports
It competes in the lower leagues.

Dukes of Sieradz-Łęczyca 
 1228-1232 Henry I the Bearded (Henryk I Brodaty)
 1232-1233 Konrad of Masovia (Konrad Mazowiecki)
 1234-1247 Konrad of Masovia (Konrad Mazowiecki)
 1247-1260 Casimir I of Mazovia (Kazimierz I Mazowiecki)
 1260-1275 Leszek the Black (Leszek Czarny)
 1275-1294 divided into two duchies of Sieradz and Łęczyca (below)
 1294-1297 Ladislaus I the Short (Władysław Łokietek)
 1297-1305 Wenceslaus II of Bohemia (Wacław II Czeski)
After 1305, parts of the united Kingdom of Poland initially as two vassal duchies, later incorporated as Łęczyca Voivodeship and Sieradz Voivodeship.

Dukes of Łęczyca 
 1233-1234 Konrad of Masovia (Konrad Mazowiecki)
 1275-1294 Casimir II of Łęczyca (Kazimierz II)
 1329-1343 Ladislaus of Dobrzyn (Władysław Dobrzyński)

After 1305 part of the united Kingdom of Poland as a vassal duchy, later after 1343 incorporated by the king Casimir III the Great as the Łęczyca Voivodeship.

Notable residents 
 Jerzy I of Halicz
 Kazimierz II
 Janisław I
 Władysław I the Elbow-high
 Władysław II Jagiełło
 Władysław III of Poland
 Vytenis
 Zygmunt II August
 Agnieszka Baranowska
 Kazimierz Franciszek Czarnkowski
 Zygmunt Grudziński (1870-1929)
 Rabbi Shlomo Ephraim Luntschitz (Lenczyk)
 Rabbi Meïr Löb ben Jehiel Michel Weiser Malbi"m
 Wacław Przeździecki
 Jakub Świnka
 Stanisław Warszycki
 Marek Wojtera
 Józef Szczepański
 Stanisław Thugutt

Twin towns – sister cities
Łęczyca is twinned with four cities: 
 Rillieux-la-Pape 
 Penzlin, Germany
 Volodymyr, Ukraine
 Rypin, Poland

See also 
 Devil Boruta
 Dukes of Sieradz-Łęczyca
 Łęczyca (disambiguation)

References

External links 

 Official website

Cities and towns in Łódź Voivodeship
Łęczyca County
Kalisz Governorate
Łódź Voivodeship (1919–1939)
Shtetls